SPFS is a Russian equivalent of the SWIFT financial transfer system, developed by the Central Bank of Russia. The system has been in successful development since 2014, when the United States government threatened to disconnect the Russian Federation from the SWIFT system.

History
The first transaction on the SPFS network involving a non-bank enterprise was executed in December 2017. In March 2018, over 400 institutions (mostly banks) were part of the network.

Compared to SWIFT, the system faced a number of challenges, especially higher transaction costs though in March 2018 transaction fee was radically reduced to 0,80–1,00 ₽ (0.012–0.015 $) per transaction. Currently the system only works within Russia, though there were plans afoot in 2018 to integrate the network with the China-based Cross-Border Inter-Bank Payments System.

The Russian Government is also in talks to expand SPFS to developing countries such as Turkey and Iran. Owing to its current limitations, the SPFS system is seen as a last resort, rather than as a replacement for the SWIFT network. Since 2019 many agreements have been reached to link SPFS to other countries' payment systems in China, India, Iran, as well as the countries inside the EAEU who are planning to use SPFS directly.

At the end of 2020, there were 23 foreign banks connected to the SPFS from Armenia, Belarus, Germany, Kazakhstan, Kyrgyzstan and Switzerland.

On March 17, 2022, Anatoly Aksakov, Chairman of the State Duma Committee on the Financial Market, announced that the Bank of Russia and the People's Bank of China are working on connecting the Russian and Chinese financial messaging systems. He also pointed to the beginning of the development of information transfer schemes using blockchains, including the digital ruble and the digital yuan.

On March 31, 2022, the Economic Times of India published information that the Indian government has offered Russia a new transaction system with the transfer of trade to the ruble and SPFS, which will work through the Reserve Bank of India and Russia's Vnesheconombank. According to the same data, the system will be put into operation within a week.

In April 2022, Russian Central Bank governor said most Russian financial institutions and 52 foreign organizations from at least 12 countries were successfully integrated with the SPFS.

On 30 January 2023, Iran had fully integrated with SPFS to help enhance trade and financial operations in an effort to bypass strict economic sanctions on their financial infrastructure. With the signing of the agreement, 52 Iranian and 106 Russian banks are connected through the SPFS.

On 20 March 2023, SWIFT was completely banned in the Russian Federation.

Geo-economic impact 
As summarized by academic Tim Beal, SPFS is among the responses to sanctions imposed by the United States viewed by commentators as contributing to dedollarization.

See also
 Cross-Border Inter-Bank Payments System (CIPS)
 Indian Financial System Code (IFSC)
 Fedwire
 Mir (payment system)
 Structured Financial Messaging System (SFMS)
 List of financial regulatory authorities by country
 SWIFT ban against Russian banks

References

External links
 Official website (in English)
 Official website (in Russian)

Financial markets software
Payment networks
Banking in Russia
Central Bank of Russia